Ian Thompson (born 26 June 1949) is a former  Australian rules footballer who played with North Melbourne in the Victorian Football League (VFL).

Notes

External links 

Living people
1949 births
Australian rules footballers from Victoria (Australia)
North Melbourne Football Club players
Kyneton Football Club players